The following balls were used in the football tournament of the Summer Olympic Games.

See also 
 List of FIFA World Cup official match balls
 List of UEFA European Championship official match balls
 List of Copa América official match balls
 List of Africa Cup of Nations official match balls
 List of AFC Asian Cup official match balls

References

External links
 The History of the Official Olympic Games Match Balls